Feira de Santana (Portuguese for "Saint Anne's Fair") is a city in Bahia, Brazil. It is the second-most populous city in the state, with a population of 619,609 according to IBGE's estimate in 2020. It is located 100 km northwest of Salvador, Bahia's capital city. These cities are connected by BR-324, a four-lane divided highway.

Name 
Feira de Santana, formerly spelled Feira de Santa Anna, is named in honor of the cattle fairs held at the St-Anne-of-the-Fountains Plantation in the 19th century.

History 

The St-Anne-of-the-Fountains Plantation was established in the 18th century by Domingos Barbosa de Araujo and his wife Anna Brandoa. Located at the edge of Bahia's "backcountry", it became a center for the cowboys on their way from the pastures there to the port of Cachoeira. The cowboys' practice of starting annual fires to clear old brush eventually worsened the area's natural aridity to the point where the cattle industry collapsed, but by then Brazilians and foreigners had begun adopting the area as their home. A city began to develop with wide streets which were bordered by commercial houses serving the area's growing population. It was incorporated as the second city in Bahia after the capital and the 31st in the entirety of colonial Brazil.

Today, Feira de Santana remains the second largest city in Bahia and an important stopping point for travelers.

Culture
Feira de Santana is famous for its parties and festivals, particularly St Anne's Day in the last week of July, which features activities such as bumba-meu-boi, segura-a-véia, and burrinha. The Micareta carnival party is held 15 days after Passover; the Festival of Violeiros in September; and the donkey race in November. The city boasts of several interesting tourist destinations including a market for local artists, a museum of contemporary art, and the Antares Astronomical Observatory. The city is the seat of the Roman Catholic Archdiocese of Feira de Santana.

Historic structures

Feira de Santana is home to numerous historic structures, many designated as Brazilian federal or Bahian state monuments. The Historic Center as a whole lacks national or state protection.

 Church of Our Lady of Remedies (Igreja de Nossa Senhora dos Remédios)
 St. Ann Cathedral (Catedral de Santana)
 Bandstand at Bernardino Bahia Square (Coreto da Praça Bernardino Bahia)
 Bandstand at Praça da Matriz (Coreto da Praça da Matriz)
 Bandstand at Praça Fróes da Motta (Coreto da Praça Fróes da Motta)
 March 25th Philharmonic Society Building (Filarmônica 25 de Março)
 Church of Our Lord of the Stations (Igreja Senhor dos Passos)
 Chapel of Saint Joseph of Itapororocas (Matriz de São José de Itapororocas)
 Town Hall of Feira de Santana (Paço Municipal, Feira de Santana)
 Panel of the Artist Lênio Braga (Painel do Artista Lênio Braga)
 Maria Quitéria School Building (Prédio da Escola Maria Quitéria)
 Santa Casa de Misericórdia of Feira de Santantana (Prédio da Santa Casa da Misericórdia de Feira de Santana)
 Vila Fróes da Motta Building (Prédio da Vila Froés da Motta)
 Municipal Public Archive of Feira de Santana (Prédio do Arquivo Público Municipal)
 Former Normal School of Feira de Santana (Prédio do Grupo Escolar J.J. Seabra, Antiga Escola Normal Rural)
 Municipal Market of Feira de Santana (Prédio Mercado Municipal, Feira de Santana)

Economy & Transport
The city is served by Gov. João Durval Carneiro Airport. With a major junction of Northeastern Brazil's highways nearby, Feira de Santana functions as a crossroads for the traffic coming from the South and West-Central portions of Brazil bound for Salvador and other important cities of the northeast. Feira de Santana, thanks in part to its longstanding importance as a crossroads and its proximity to Salvador, is now an important and diverse commercial and industrial center.

Education
The Universidade Estadual de Feira de Santana is located in the city.

Sport
There is a motorsport rallying club Trail Clube Bahia and have significant input into the Rally Bahia race.

The city's main stadium is the Estádio Alberto Oliveira one of the main stadiums in the state of Bahia. The city's second stadium is Estádio Jodilton Souza.

There are four football clubs: Bahia de Feira, Feirense EC, Fluminense de Feira and Associação Desportiva Comunitária Astro.

Notable people
 Anderson Talisca, footballer
 Carlos Felipe, mixed martial artist (Ultimate Fighting Championship)
 Cristiano Teixeira, footballer
 Divaldo Pereira Franco, spiritist medium
 Fábio Baiano, retired footballer
 Irving São Paulo, actor
 Joedson Santos Almeida, footballer
 Jorge Wagner, retired footballer
 Júnior Baiano, retired footballer
 Maria Quitéria, lieutenant and first woman to serve in a military unit in Brazil

See also 
 State University of Feira de Santana
 Largest Cities of Northeast Region, Brazil
 Boulevard Shopping Feira de Santana

Notes

References

External links

 
Municipalities in Bahia